This is a sub-list of the List of marine Perciform fishes of South Africa for fishes of the suborder Percoidei recorded from the oceans bordering South Africa. This list comprises locally used common names, scientific names with author citation and recorded ranges. Ranges specified may not be the entire known range for the species, but should include the known range within the waters surrounding the Republic of South Africa.

List ordering and taxonomy complies where possible with the current usage in Wikispecies, and may differ from the cited source, as listed citations are primarily for range or existence of records for the region. Sub-taxa within any given taxon are arranged alphabetically as a general rule. Synonyms may be listed where useful.

Suborder: Percoidei

Superfamily: Cepoloidea

Family: Cepolidae — Bandfishes
Bandfish Acanthocepola indica (Day, 1888) (Occasionally taken by trawl in coastal waters from Natal to Japan)
Owstonia weberi (Gilchrist, 1922) (Natal to Kenya)

Superfamily: Cirrhitoidea

Family: Cheilodactylidae — Fingerfins
Redfingers Cheilodactylus fasciatus Lacepède, 1803 (Kunene river, Namibia to Durban)
Barred fingerfin Cheilodactylus pixi Smith, 1980 (Knysna to Coffee Bay)(False Bay to Coffee Bay)
Twotone fingerfin Chirodactylus brachydactylus (Cuvier, 1830) (Walvis Bay to Delagoa Bay)
Bank steenbras Chirodactylis grandis (Günther, 1860) (Walvis Bay to possibly Natal)
Natal fingerfin Chirodactylus jessicalenorum Smith, 1980 (Coffee Bay Transkei to Sodwana Bay)

Family: Cirrhitidae — Hawkfishes
Twospot hawkfish Amblycirrhitus bimacula (Jenkins, 1903) (Indo-Pacific south to Durban)
Spotted hawkfish Cirrhitichthys oxycephalus (Bleeker, 1855) (Indo-Pacific south to East London)
Marbled hawkfish Cirrhitus pinnulatus (Schneider, 1801) (Indo-Pacific south to Port Alfred)
Blackspotted hawkfish Cirrhitus punctatus (Cuvier, 1829) (Mauritius, Madagascar, Mozanbique and South Africa south to Bizana)
Swallowtail hawkfish Cyprinocirrhites polyactis (Bleeker, 1875) (East Africa south to Algoa Bay)
Horseshoe hawkfish Paracirrhites arcatus (Cuvier, 1829) (Indo-Pacific south to the Transkei)
Freckled hawkfish Paracirrhites forsteri (Schneider, 1801) (Indo-Pacific south to Northern KwaZulu-Natal)

Superfamily: Percoidea

Family: Acropomatidae — Lanternbellies
Lanternbelly Acropoma japonicum Günther, 1859 (off Natal)
Howella sherborni (Norman, 1930) (off Cape Town to Natal)
Sombre splitfin Neoscomberops annectens Gilchrist, 1922 (off Natal and southern Mozambique)
Silver splitfin Neoscomberops cynodon (Regan, 1921) (Known from 2 specimens off Natal)
Japanese splitfin Synagrops japonicus (Doderlein, 1884) (off Natal)

Family: Ambassidae — Glassies
Glassy or Bald glassy Ambassis gymnocephalus (Lacepède, 1802) (Port Elizabeth to tropical Indian Ocean)
Slender glassy Ambassis natalensis Gilchrist & Thompson, 1908 (Natal south to Umtata River)
Longspine glassy Ambassis productus Guichenot, 1866 (Madagascar and east African coast south to southern Natal)

Family: Apogonidae — Cardinal fishes (see also Epigonidae)
Subfamily: Apogoninae

Broadstriped cardinal Apogon angustatus (Smith and Radcliffe, 1911) (Red Sea to Natal)
Short tooth cardinal Apogon apogonides (Bleeker, 1856) (Indo-Pacific south to Durban)
Bandtail cardinal Apogon aureus (Lacepède, 1802) (Red Sea south to Durban)
Ruby cardinal Apogon coccineus Rüppell, 1838 (Red Sea south to Durban)
Blackbanded cardinal Apogon cookii Macleay, 1881 (Western Indian Ocean south to Durban)
Diamond cardinal Apogon enigmaticus (Smith, 1961) (1 specimen off Durban)
Coachwhip cardinal Apogon flagelliferus (Smith, 1961) (Sodwana Bay and Mozambique)
Spurcheek cardinal Apogon fraenatus Valenciennes, 1832 (Durban to Red Sea)
Spinyhead cardinal Apogon kallopterus Bleeker, 1856 (Algoa Bay to Red Sea)
Smallscale cardinal Apogon multitaeniatus Ehrenberg, 1828 (Red Sea to Durban)
Blackfoot cardinal Apogon nigripes Playfair, 1867 (Lake St. Lucia northwards, probably to Red Sea)
Spotfin cardinal Apogon queketti Gilchrist, 1903 (Natal coast to southern Red Sea)
Threeband cardinal Apogon semiornatus Peters, 1876 (Indo-West Pacific south to Durban)
Ninestripe cardinal Apogon taeniophorus Regan, 1908 (Indian Ocean south to Sodwana Bay)
Masked cardinal Apogon thermalis Cuvier, 1829 (Indo-West Pacific to southern Natal)
Sad cardinal Apogon timorensis Bleeker, 1854 (Indo-West Pacific, Red Sea south to Sodwana Bay)
Ocellated cardinal Apogonichthys ocellatus (Weber, 1913) (Indo-West Pacific south to Coffee Bay)
Speckled cardinal Apogonichthys Bleeker, 1954 (Indo-West Pacific, Red Sea to Sodwana Bay)
Shimmering cardinal Archamia lineolata (Ehrenberg, 1828) (Indo-Pacific, Red sea to Durban)
Mozambique cardinal Archamia mozambiquensis Smith, 1961 (Zanzibar to Sodwana Bay)
Tiger cardinal Cheilodipterus lineatus Lacepède, 1801 (Sodwana Bay to Red Sea)
Foa Foa brachygramma (Jenkins, 1903) (Indo-Pacific south to Natal)
Crosseyed cardinal Fowleria aurita (Valenciennes, 1831) (Natal to Red Sea)
Arrow cardinal Rhabdamia gracilis (Bleeker, 1856) (Indo-West Pacific south to Sodwana Bay)
Sea urchin cardinal Siphamia mossambica Smith, 1955 (Kenya to Sodwana Bay)

Subfamily: Pseudaminae

Jelly cardinal Pseudamia gelatinosa Smith, 1955 (Indo-Pacific south to Sodwana Bay)
Limpid cardinal Pseudamiops pellucidus (Smith, 1954) (East Africa south to Sodwana Bay)

Family: Bathyclupeidae — Bathyclupeids
Bathyclupea elongata Trunov, 1975 (Known only from holotype taken off Western Cape)

Family: Bramidae — Pomfrets
Pomfret Brama brama (Bonnaterre, 1788) (Algoa Bay to Walvis Bay)
Tropical pomfret Brama orcini Cuvier, 1831 (off Natal, Tropical Indo-Pacific)
Fanfish Pteraclis velifera (Pallas, 1769) (off Mozambique, Durban, East London, Port Elizabeth and St. Helena Bay)
Prickly fanfish Pterycombus petersii (Hilgendorff, 1878) (Mid Pacific to Africa, south round the Cape of good Hope to Cape Town)
Rough pomfret Taractes asper Lowe, 1843 (North Atlantic, North Pacific, Southern Madagascar to Natal and the Cape)
Sickle pomfret Taractichthys steindachneri (Döderlein, 1883) (Indo-Pacific from California to Zanzibar and south to False Bay)

Family: Caesionidae — Fusiliers

Blue-and-gold fusilier Caesio caerulaurea Lacepède, 1801 (Port Elizabeth to Mozambique)
Lunar fusilier Caesio lunaris Ehrenberg, 1830 (Red Sea south to Natal)
Beautiful fusilier Caesio teres Seale, 1906 (Sodwana Bay to Kenya)
Yellowback fusilier Caesio xanthanota Bleeker, 1853 (Indian Ocean south to Sodwana Bay)
Dark-banded fusilier Pterocaesio tile Cuvier, 1830 (East Africa south to Sodwana Bay, juvenile found at Haga Haga just north of East London)

Family: Callanthiidae — Goldies
Goldie Callanthias legras Smith, 1947 (Dassen Island (Western Cape) to Natal)

Family: Carangidae — Kingfishes

Threadfin mirrorfish or African pompano Alectis ciliaris (Bloch 1787) (Algoa Bay northwards, cicumtropical)
Indian mirrorfish or Indian threadfish Alectis indicus (Rüppell, 1830) (Durban northwards throughout Indian Ocean)
Shrimp scad Alepes djedaba (Forsskål, 1775) (Durban northwards to Red Sea)
Longfin kingfish Carangoides armatus (Rüppell, 1830) (East London northwards throughout Indian Ocean to Gulf of Thailand and Japan)
Longnose kingfish Carangoides chrysophrys (Cuvier, 1833) (Algoa Bay northward, and eastward to Japan and Australia)
Coastal kingfish Carangoides coeruleopinnatus (Rüppell, 1830) (Durban northwards, and eastwards to Japan and Australia)
Shadow kingfish Carangoides dinema Bleeker, 1851 (Durban northward to Tanzania)
Whitefin kingfish Carangoides equula (Temminck & Schlegel, 1844) (Algoa Bay northward to Somalia and Gulf of Oman)
Blue kingfish Carangoides ferdau (Forsskål, 1775) (Indo-West Pacific south to Port Elizabeth)
Yellowspotted kingfish Carangoides fulvoguttatus (Forsskål, 1775) (Indo-West Pacific south to Durban)
Bludger Carangoides gymnostethus (Cuvier, 1833) (Indo-West Pacific to Algoa Bay)
Bumpnose kingfish Carangoides hedlandensis (Whitley, 1934) (Durban northwards in coastal waters)
Malabar kingfish Carangoides malabaricus (Bloch & Schneider, 1801) (Tropical Indo-West Pacific south to Durban)
Coachwhip kingfish Carangoides oblongus (Cuvier, 1833) (Western Indian Ocean south to Durban)
Barcheek kingfish Carangoides plagiotaenia (Bleeker, 1857) (Indo-West Pacific south to Durban)
Blacktip kingfish Caranx heberi (Bennett, 1830) (Durban north to Zanzibar)(syn. Caranx sem Cuvier, 1833)
Giant kingfish Caranx ignobilis (Forsskål, 1775) (Indo-West Pacific south to Port Elizabeth)
Black kingfish Caranx lugubris Poey, 1860 (Circumtropical. Taken off East London)
Bluefin kingfish Caranx melampygus Cuvier, 1833 (Tropical Indo-Pacific south to Natal)
Brassy kingfish Caranx papuensis Alleyne & Macleay, 1877 (Port Alfred north to Zanzibar)
Bigeye kingfish Caranx sexfasciatus Quoy & Gaimard, 1825 (Tropical Ind-Pacific south to Natal)
Tille kingfish Caranx tille Cuvier, 1833 (Durban north to Zanzibar)
Mackerel scad Decapterus macarellus (Cuvier, 1833) (Knysna northward, Circumtropical)
Slender scad Decapterus macrosoma Bleeker, 1851 (Indo-Pacific south to Knysna)
Indian scad Decapterus russelli (Rüppell, 1830) (Durban northwards to Japan and Australia)
Rainbow runner Elagatis bipinnulata (Quoy & Gaimard, 1825) (Durban northwards, Circumtropical)
Golden kingfish Gnathanodon speciosus (Forsskål, 1775) (Tropical Indo-Pacific south to Northern KwaZulu-Natal)(syn. Gnathodon speciosus)
Leervis or Garrick Lichia amia (Linnaeus, 1758) (Mediterranean sea south along west coast of Africa and around Cape to Delagoa Bay)
Torpedo scad Megalaspis cordyla (Linnaeus, 1758) (Tropical Indo-West Pacific south to East London)
Pilotfish Naucrates ductor (Linnaeus, 1758) (Circumtropical, common throughout Indian Ocean)
White kingfish Pseudocarymx dentex (Bloch & Schneider, 1801) (Durban southwards, anti-tropical on both sides of Atlantic, Mediterranean, Indo-West Pacific)
Talang queenfish Scomberoides commersonnianus Lacepède, 1801 (Indian Ocean south to Port Elizabeth)
Doublespotted queenfish Scomberoides lysan (Forsskål, 1775) (Indo-West Pacific south to Durban)
Needlescaled queenfish Scomberoides tol (Cuvier, 1832) (Indian Ocean south to Natal)
Greater yellowtail or Greater amberjack Seriola dumerill Risso, 1810 (Algoa Bay to Persian Gulf)
Giant yellowtail Seriola lalandi Valenciennes, 1833 (Most common on Atlantic Cape waters, but follows the pilchard migration to Transkei and Natal. Circumglobal in subtropical waters)
Longfin yellowtail Seriola rivoliana Valenciennes, 1833 (Knysna northward. Circumtropical entering temperate waters in some places)
Blackbanded kingfish Seriolina nigrofasciata (Rüppell, 1829) (Indian Ocean south to Algoa Bay)
Southern pompano Trachinotus africanus Smith, 1967 (Knysna to Delagoa Bay)
Smallspotted pompano Trachinotus baillonii (Lacepède, 1801) (Indo-West Pacific south to Natal)
Snubnose pompano Trachinotus blochii (Lacepède, 1801) (Indo-West Pacific south to Durban)
Largespotted pompano Trachinotus botla (Shaw, 1803) (Algoa Bay to Kenya)
African maasbanker Trachurus delagoa Nekrasov, 1970 (Eastern Cape province to Mozambique)
Maasbanker Trachurus trachurus (Linnaeus, 1758) (Norway south and round the Cape of Good Hope to Delagoa Bay
Cottonmouth kingfish Uraspis secunda (Poey, 1860) (Algoa Bay)

Family: Caristiidae — Manefishes
Caristius groenlandicus Jensen, 1942 (off Durban)
Caristius sp. (off Durban)

Family: Centracanthidae — Picarels
Picarel Spicara australis (Regan, 1921) (Known only from off Natal)
Windtoy Spicara axillaris (Boulanger, 1900) (Known only from Cape Town to Natal)

Family: Chaetodontidae — Butterflyfishes
Threadfin butterflyfish Chaetodon auriga Forsskål, 1775 (Tropical Ind-Pacific south to Mossel Bay)
Brownburnie Chaetodon blackburnii Desjardins, 1836 (Tropical Indo-Pacific south to Bashee River)
Blackedged butterflyfish Chaetodon dolosus Ahl, 1923 (East African coast south to Xora River)
Gorgeous gussie Chaetodon guttatissimus Bennett, 1833 (Durban to Red Sea)
Whitespotted butterflyfish Chaetodon kleinii Bloch, 1790 (Red sea and Indian Ocean south to Coffee Bay)
Lined butterflyfish Chaetodon lineolatus Quoy and gaimard, 1831 (Red sea and Indian Ocean south to Durban)
Raccoon butterflyfish or Halfmoon butterflyfish Chaetodon lunula (Lacepède, 1802) (South Africa to Hawaii, Japan and Australia. South to East London)
Pearly butterflyfish Chaetodon madagaskariensis Ahl, 1923 (Indian Ocean south to Port Elizabeth)
Doublesash butterflyfish Chaetodon marleyi Regan, 1921 (Lamberts Bay to Maputo. Endemic)
Blackback butterflyfish Chaetodon melanotus Bloch and Schneider, 1801 (Red Sea south to Durban)
Maypole butterflyfish Chaetodon meyeri Bloch & Schneider, 1801 (Indo-Pacific south to Durban)
Rightangle butterflyfish Chaetodon trifascialis Quoy and Gaimard, 1825 (Red Sea south to Tugela River)
Purple butterflyfish Chaetodon trifasciatus Mungo Park, 1797 (Indo-Pacific from Kosi Bay to Hawaii)
Limespot butterflyfish Chaetodon unimaculatus Bloch, 1787 (Indian Ocean south to Port Alfred)
Vagabond butterflyfish Chaetodon vagabundus Linnaeus, 1758 (Red Sea south to Durban)
Yellowhead buttrflyfish Chaetodon xanthocephalus Bennett, 1832 (Western Indian Ocean south to Durban)
Zanzibar butterflyfish Chaetodon zanzibarensis Playfair, 1867 (Zanzibar to Durban)
Longnose butterflyfish Forcipiger flavissimus Jordan & McGregor, 1898 (Red Sea to Durban)
Brushtooth butterflyfish Hemitaurichthys zoster (Bennett, 1831) (Western Indian Ocean south to Sodwana Bay)
Coachman Heniochus acuminatus (Linnaeus, 1758) (Port Alfred to Mozambique) (Indo-West Pacific south to Durban)
Schooling coachman Heniochus diphreutes Jordan, 1903 (Red Sea and Indo-West Pacific south to Durban))
Masked coachman Heniochus monoceros Cuvier, 1831 (Indo-West Pacific south to Cape Vidal)

Family: Coryphaenidae — Dolphinfish or Dorades
Dolphinfish Coryphaena hippurus Linnaeus, 1758 (all tropical and subtropical waters to 35°S)

Family: Dichistiidae — Galjoens
Galjoen Dichistius capensis (Cuvier, 1831) (Southern Angola to Sodwana Bay) (syn. Coracinus capensis)
Banded galjoen Dichistius multifasciatus (Pellegrin, 1914) (Port Alfred to Mozambique) (Still Bay to Madagascar) (syn. Coracinus multifaciatus)

Family: Dinopercidae
Cavebass Dinoperca petersi (Day, 1875) (Port Elizabeth to Mozambique)

Family: Drepaneidae — Sicklefishes
Concertina-fish Drepane longimanus (Bloch and Schneider, 1801) (Tropical Indo-West Pacific south to East London)

Family: Echeneidae — Remoras
Shark remora Echineis naucrates Linnaeus, 1758 (Namibia to Mozambique) (all warm waters except eastern Pacific)
Slender remora Phtheirichthys lineatus (Menzies, 1791) (Worldwide in tropical and subtropical waters)
Whale remora Remora australis (Bennett, 1840) (Worldwide, pelagic: found only on cetaceans)
Spearfish remora Remora brachyptera (Lowe, 1839) (Worldwide, prefers billfishes)
Remora Remora remora (Linnaeus, 1758) (Worldwide, prefers sharks)
White remora Remorina albescens (Temminck & Schlegel, 1845) (Worldwide, prefers Manta rays)

Family: Emmelichthyidae — Rovers
Southern rover Emmelichthys nitidus nitidus Richardson 1845 (occasionally take off western Cape coast)
Japanese rubyfish Erythrocles schlegelii (Richardson, 1846) (one specimen from off Durban)
Rubyfish Plagiogeneion rubiginosum (Hutton, 1875) (off Algoa Bay, off Vema Seamount)

Family: Epigonidae — Cardinal fishes (see also Apogonidae)
Pencil cardinal Epigonus denticulatus Dieuzeide, 1950 (Walvis Bay to Cape Point)
Epigonus pandionus (Goode & Bean, 1881) (Gulf of Guinea to Agulhas Bank)
Epigonus robustus (Barnard, 1927) (off west coast of South Africa)
Telescope cardinal Epigonus telescopus (Risso, 1810) (Walvis Bay to Cape Town)

Family: Gerreidae — Pursemouths
Threadfin pursemouth Gerres filamentosis Cuvier, 1829 (Indo-Pacific south to Algoa Bay)
Smallscale pursemouth Gerres longirostris (Lacepède, 1801) (Port Elizabeth to Mozambique)(syn. Gerres acinaces)
Oblong pursemouth Gerres oblongus Cuvier, 1830 (Tropical Indo-Pacific south to Kosi Bay)
Slenderspine pursemouth Gerres oyena (Forsskål, 1775) (Tropical Indo-Pacific south to Kosi Bay)
Evenfin pursemouth Gerres rappi (Barnard, 1927) (Algoa Bay to southern Mozambique)

Family: Haemulidae — Rubberlips and grunters
Sailfin rubberlip Diagramma pictum (Thunberg, 1792) (Indo-West Pacific to south Natal)
Dusky rubberlip Plectorhinchus chubbi (Regan, 1919) (Transkei to Kenya and India)
Lemonfish Plectorhynchus flavomaculatus (Ehrenberg, 1830) (Transkei to Red Sea)
Blackspotted rubberlip Plectorhynchus gaterinus (Forsskål, 1775) (Natal to Red Sea)
Harry hotlips Plectorhynchus gibbosus (Lacepède, 1802) (Indo-West Pacific, south to Natal)
Barred rubberlip Plectorhynchus plagiodesmus Fowler, 1935 (Somalia to Madagascar and Natal)
Whitebarred rubberlip Plectorhinchus playfairi (Pellegrin, 1914) (Western Indian Ocean to Port St. Johns)
Minstrel Plectorhynchus schotaf (Forsskål, 1775) (Indo-West Pacific south to Port St. Johns)
Redlip rubberlip Plectorhynchus sordidus (Klunzinger, 1870) (Red Sea to Transkei)
Spotted grunter Pomadasys commersonnii (Lacepède, 1801) (False Bay to India)
Grey grunter Pomadasys furcatum (Bloch and Schneider, 1801) (Madagascar to Natal, rare south of Durban)
Javelin grunter Pomadasys kaakan (Cuvier, 1830) (Indo-Pacific south to Transkei)
Saddle grunter Pomadasys maculatum (Bloch, 1797) (Indo-West Pacific south to Transkei)
Cock grunter Pomadasys multimaculatum (Playfair, 1866) (Algoa Bay to Zanzibar)
Pinky or Piggy Pomadasys olivaceus (Day, 1875) (Cape Agulhas to Mozambique)
Striped grunter Pomadasys striatus (Gilchrist and Thompson, 1908) (Knysna to Beira)
Lined piggy Pomadasys stridens (Forsskål, 1775) (Red Sea to Natal)

Family: Kuhliidae — Flagtails
Barred flagtail Kuhlia mugil (Forster in Bloch and Schneider, 1801)(Cape Agulhas to Indo-Pacific)
Rock flagtail Kuhlia rupestris (Lacepède, 1802) (Indo-Pacific south to Durban)

Family: Kyphosidae — Sea chubs
Grey chub Kyphosus bigibbus Lacepède, 1801 (Red Sea to Cape Point)
Blue chub Kyphosus cinerescens (Forsskål, 1775) (Read Sea to East London)
Brassy chub Kyphosus vaigiensis (Quoy & Gaimard, 1825) (Indo-Pacific south to Algoa Bay)
Stonebream Neoscorpis lithophilus (Gilchrist & Thompson, 1908) (False Bay to southern Mozambique)

Family: Leiognathidae — Soapies
Toothed soapy Gazza minuta (Bloch, 1797) (Indo-Pacific south to Port Alfred)
Slimy Leiognathus equulus (Forsskål, 1775) (Indo-Pacific south to East London)
Slender soapy Secutor insidiator (Bloch, 1787) (Indo-West Pacific south to East London)
Pugnose soapy Secutor ruconius (Hamilton-Buchanan, 1822) (Indo-West Pacific south to Transkei)

Family: Lethrinidae — Emperors
Glowfish Gnathodentex aureolineatus (Lacepède, 1802) (Indo-West Pacific to Durban)
Grey barenose Gymnocranius griseus (Temminck & Schlegel, 1843) (Indo-West Pacific south to Natal)
Rippled barenose Gymnocranius robinsoni (Gilchrist & Thompson, 1908) (Indo-West Pacific south to Sodwana Bay)
Yellowfin emperor Lethrinus crocineus (Smith, 1959) (Western Indian Ocean south to Natal)
Longnose emperor Lethrinus elongatus Valenciennes, 1830 (Indo-West Pacific south to Natal)
Blackspot emperor Lethrinus harak (Forsskål, 1775) (Indo-West Pacific south to Natal)
Redspot emperor Lethrinus lentjan (Lacepède, 1802) (Indo-West Pacific south to Sodwana Bay)
Sky emperor Lethrinus mahsena (Forsskål, 1775) (Indo-West Pacific south to Sodwana Bay)
Snubnose emperor Lethrinus mahsenoides Valenciennes, 1830 (Indo-West Pacific south to Sodwana Bay)
Blue emperor Lethrinus nebulosus (Forsskål, 1775) (Indo-West Pacific to Algoa Bay)
Orange striped emperor Lethrinus ramak (Forsskål, 1775) (Indo-West Pacific to Natal)
Spotcheek emperor Lethrinus rubrioperculatus Sato, 1978 (Indo-West Pacific south to Natal)
Cutthroat emperor Lethrinus sanguineus Smith, 1955 (Western Indian Ocean south to Sodwana Bay)
Variegated emperor Lethrinus variegatus Ehrenberg, 1830 (Indo-West Pacific south to Natal)
Bigeye barenose Monotaxis grandoculis (Forsskål, 1775) (Indo-Pacific south to Natal)

Family: Lobotidae — Tripletails
Tripletail Lobotes surinamensis (Bloch, 1790) (Cape St Francis northwards, all tropical and subtropical oceans)

Family: Lutjanidae — Snappers
Blue smalltooth job Aphareus furca (Forsskål, 1775) (Tropical Indo-Pacific to Sodwana Bay)
Red smalltooth job Aphareus rutilans Cuvier, 1830 (Tropical Indo-Pacific south to Durban)
Kaakap or Green jobfish Aprion virescens Valenciennes, 1830 (Central KwaZulu-Natal to Mozambique)
Ruby snapper Etelis coruscans Valenciennes, 1862 (Tropical/subtropical Indo-Pacific south to Bashee River)
River snapper Lutjanus argentimaculatus (Forsskål, 1775) (Red sea and tropical Indo-Pacific south to East London)
Twinspot snapper Lutjanus bohar (Forsskål, 1775) (Red Sea and tropical Indo-West Pacific south to Durban)
Blackspot snapper Lutjanus ehrenbergii (Peters, 1869) (Red Sea and tropical Indo-West pacific south to Natal)
Dory snapper Lutjanus fulviflamma (Forsskål, 1775) (Red Sea and tropical Indo-West Pacific south to East London)
Yellow striped snapper Lutjanus fulvus (Schneider, 1801) (Tropical Indo-West Pacific south to Bashee River)
Humpback snapper Lutjanus gibbus (Forsskål, 1775) (Red Sea and tropical Indo-West Pacific south to Durban)
Bluebanded snapper Lutjanus kasmira (Forsskål, 1775) (Red Sea and tropical Indo-West Pacific south to East London)
Sweetlip snapper Lutjanus lemniscatus (Valenciennes, 1828) (Tropical Indian Ocean to Durban)
Bluestriped snapper Lutjanus notatus (Cuvier, 1828) (East African coast south to Durban)
Speckled snapper Lutjanus rivulatus (Cuvier, 1828) (Tropical Indo-West Pacific south to Durban)
Russell's snapper Lutjanus russellii (Bleeker, 1849) (Central KwaZulu-Natal to Mozambique)
Blood snapper Lutjanus sanguineus (Cuvier, 1828) (Western Indian Ocean south to Algoa Bay)
Emperor snapper Lutjanus sebae (Cuvier, 1816) (Tropical Indo-West Pacific south to Durban)
Black beauty Macolor niger (Forsskål, 1775) (Tropical Indo-Pacific south to Sodwana Bay, 1 juvenile from Durban) 
Yellowtail fuselier Paracaesio xanthura (Bleeker, 1869) (Tropical Indo-West Pacific south to Durban)
Rosy jobfish Pristipomoides filamentosus (Day, 1870) (Tropical Indo-Pacific south to East London)

Family: Malacanthidae — Tilefishes
Ribbed tilefish Branchiostegus doliatus (Cuvier, 1830) (Durban to Maputo)
Spotted tilefish Branchiostegus sawakinensis Amirthalingam, 1969 (Off Durban; Red sea)
Forktail tilefish Hoplolatilus fronticinctus (Günther, 1887) (Postlarvae collected off Cape Peninsula; India and Western Pacific)
Stripetail filefish Malacanthus brevirostris Guichenot, 1848 (Tropical Indo-Pacific south to Sodwana Bay. Postlarvae drift to near Port Alfred)

Family: Menidae — Moonfish
Moonfish Mena maculata (Bloch & Schneider, 1801) (Tropical Indo Pacific south to Durban)

Family: Monodactylidae — Moonies
Natal moony Monodactylus argenteus (Linnaeus, 1758) (Red Sea to Cape Infanta)
Cape moony Monodactylus falciformis Lacepède, 1801 (Red Sea to False Bay)

Family: Mullidae — Goatfishes
Yellowstripe goatfish Mulloidichthys flavolineatus (Lacepède, 1801) (Red Sea to Knysna)(syn. Mulloides flavolineatus Lacepède, 1801)
Flame goatfish or Yellowfin goatfish Mulloidichthys vanicolensis (Valenciennes, 1831) (Northern KwaZulu-Natal to Indo-West Pacific)(syn. Mulloides vanicolensis)
Dash-dot goatfish Parupeneus barberinus (Lacepède, 1801) (Indo-West Pacific south to Mossel Bay)
Two-saddle goatfish Parupeneus bifasciatus (Lacepède, 1801) (Indo-West Pacific south to Sodwana Bay)
Redspot goatfish Parupeneus cinnabarinus (Cuvier, 1829) (Red Sea south to Transkei)
Goldsaddle goatfish Parupeneus cyclostomus (Lacepède, 1801) (Red Sea to Durban)
Indian goatfish Parupeneus indicus Shaw, 1803 (Indo-West Pacific to Port Alfred)
Band dot goatfish Parupeneus macronema (Lacepède, 1801) (Red Sea to Sodwana Bay)
Blacksaddle goatfish Parupeneus rubescens (Lacepède, 1801) (Cape Agulhas to Mozambique)
Blackstriped goatfish Upeneus tragula Richardson, 1846 (Indo-West Pacific south to Durban)
Yellowbanded goatfish Upeneus vittatus (Forsskål, 1775) (Red Sea to East London)

Family: Nemipteridae — Butterfly breams, spinecheeks
Silverflash spinecheek Scolopsis vosmeri (Bloch, 1792) (Tropical Indo-West Pacific south to Durban)

Family: Opistognathidae — Jawfishes
Halfscaled jawfish Opistognathus margaretae Smith-Vaniz, 1983 (Natal to Shimoni, Kenya)
Robust jawfish Opistognathus muscatensis Boulenger, 1887 (Durban to the Persian gulf)
Bridled jawfish Opistognathus nigromarginatus Rüppell, 1830 (Natal to south China Sea)

Family: Oplegnathidae — Knifejaws
Cape knifejaw Oplegnathus conwayi Richardson, 1840 (False Bay to Durban)
Natal knifejaw Oplegnathus robinsoni Regan, 1916 (Central KwaZulu-Natal to Mozambique)

Family: Parascorpididae — Jutjaw
Jutjaw (Parascorpis typus) Bleeker, 1875 (Known only from False Bay to Maputo)

Family: Pempheridae — Sweepers
Slender sweeper Parapriacanthus ransonneti Steindachner, 1870 (Red Sea south to Transkei)
Dusky sweeper Pempheris adusta Bleeker, 1877 (Indo-West Pacific south to Transkei)
Black-stripe sweeper Pempheris schwenkii Bleeker, 1855 (Indo-West Pacific south to Natal)

Family: Pentacerotidae — Armourheads
Sailfin armourhead Histiopterus typus Temminck & Schlegel, 1844 (Cape Agulhas to Natal)
Cape armourhead Pentaceros capensis Cuvier, 1829 (Port Nolloth to Southern Mozambique)
Pelagic armourhead Pseudopentaceros (Smith, 1844) (Cape Town to Natal)

Family: Plesiopidae — Longfins
Subfamily: Acanthoclininae — Spiny basslets

Scotty Acanthoplesiops indicus (Day, 1888) (Tropical Indian Ocean from India to Durban)

Subfamily: Plesiopinae

Spotted longfin Plesiops multisquamatus Inger, 1955 (Known only from Natal)

Family: Polynemidae — Threadfins

Indian threadfin Polydactylus indicus (Shaw, 1804) (Indo-West Pacific south to Durban)
Striped threadfin Polydactylus plebeius (Broussonet, 1782) (Red Sea to Knysna)
Sixfinger threadfin Polydactylus sextarius (Bloch & Schneider, 1801) (Indo-West Pacific south to Algoa Bay)

Family: Polyprionidae — Wreckfishes
Wreckfish Polyprion americanus (Schneider, 1801) (Norway to South Africa)

Family: Pomacanthidae — Angelfishes
Tiger angelfish Apolemichthys kingi Heemstra, 1984 (Only known from off Natal: Durban, Tongaat and Aliwal shoal)
Threespot angelfish Apolemichthys trimaculatus (Lacepède, 1831) (Indo-West Pacific to Natal)
Jumping bean Centropyge acanthops (Norman, 1922) (Port Elizabeth to Somalia)
Coral beauty Centropyge bispinosa (Günther, 1860) (Indo-West Pacific south to Sodwana)
Dusky cherub Centropyge multispinis (Playfair, 1867) (Indo-West Pacific south to Natal)
Goldtail angelfish Pomacanthus chrysurus Cuvier, 1831 (Indo-West Pacific south to Aliwal Shoal)
Emperor angelfish Pomacanthus imperator (Bloch, 1787) (Indo-West Pacific south to East London)
Old woman Pomacanthus rhomboides (Gilchrist & Thompson, 1908) (Red Sea to Knysna) Previously known as Pomacanthus striatus Rüppell, 1836, but Rüppell's species is a synonym of P. maculosus (Forsskål, 1775)
Semicircle angelfish Pomacanthus semicirculatus (Cuvier, 1831) (Indo-West Pacific to Port Elizabeth)
Royal angelfish Pygoplites diacanthus (Boddaert, 1772) (Indo-West Pacific south to Sodwana Bay)

Family: Pomatomidae — Elf
Elf or Shad Pomatomus saltatrix (Linnaeus, 1766)(Namibia to Maputo)

Family: Priacanthidae — Bigeyes
Bulleye Cookeolus boops Schneider, 1801 (Algoa Bay to Beira)
Glass bigeye Heteropriacanthus cruentatus (Lacepède, 1801) (East coast of Africa south to Durban)
Crescent-tail bigeye Priacanthus hamrur (Forsskål, 1775) (Knysna to Mozambique)
Japanese bigeye Pristigenys niphonia (Cuvier, 1829) (Indian Ocean south to Algoa Bay)

Family: Pseudochromidae — Dottybacks
Subfamily: Anisochrominae

Subfamily: Congrogadinae — Snakelets

Snakelet Halidesmus scapularis Günther, 1872 (Cape Columbine to Transkei)(False Bay to Coffee Bay)
Zulu snakelet Hilimuraena shakai Winterbottom, 1978 (Sodwana Bay)
Pencil snakelet Natalichthys leptus Winterbottom, 1980 (Natal, off Umhlangankulu River)
Natal snakelet Natalichthys ori Winterbottom, 1980 (Natal, off Umhlangankulu River)
Nail snakelet Natalichthys sam Winterbottom, 1980 (Natal, off Port Shepstone)

Subfamily: Pseudochrominae

Dutoiti Pseudochromis dutoiti Smith, 1955 (Durban to Persian gulf)
Dark dottyback Pseudochromis melas Lubbock, 1977 (1 specimen from Sodwana Bay, 2 from Kenya)
Natal dottyback Pseudochromis natalensis Regan, 1916 (Durban to Kenya)
Bicoloured dottyback Pseudochromis pesi Lubbock, 1975 (Sodwana Bay and Gulf of Aqaba)
Redlip dottyback Pseudochromis sp. (Kenya to Aliwal Shoal)
Lightheaded dottyback Pseudochromis tauberae Lubbock, 1977 (Sodwana Bay to Madagascar and Kenya)

Subfamily: Pseudoplesiopinae

Chlidichthys pembae Smith, 1954 (Tanzania, Ibo (Mozambique), Comoros and Sodwana Bay)

Family: Rachycentridae — Cobia
Prodigal son Rachycentron canadum (Linnaeus, 1766) (Warm waters of the Atlantic and Indo-Pacific, occasionally reaching False Bay)

Family: Sciaenidae — Kobs
Kob, Giant Kob or Kabeljou Argyrosomus japonicus (Temminck & Schlegel, 1843) (Namibia to Natal) previously misidentified as Argyrosomus hololepidotus (Lacepède, 1801)
Squaretail kob Argyrosomus thorpei Smith, 1977 (Algoa Bay to Tugela River)
Geelbek Atractoscion aequidens (Cuvier, 1830) (Angola to northern KwaZulu-Natal)
Longfin Kob Atrobucca nibe (Jordan and Thompson, 1911) (Natal)
Bellfish Johnius amblycephalus (Bleeker, 1855) (Indo-West Pacific to Algoa Bay)
Small kob Johnius dussumieri (Cuvier, 1830) (East London to Singapore)
Snapper kob Otolithes ruber (Bloch & Schneider, 1801) (Indo-West Pacific south to Durban)
Baardman or Belman Umbrina canariensis Valenciennes, 1843 (Morocco to the Cape of Good Hope through to Pakistan)
Slender baardman Umbrina ronchus Valenciennes, 1843 (KwaZulu-Natal)

Family: Scombropidae — Gnomefishes
Gnomefish Scombrops boops (Houttuyn, 1782) (Cape of Good Hope to Delagoa Bay)

Family: Serranidae — Rockcods (groupers) and seabasses
Subfamily: Anthiniinae

Harlequin goldie Anthias connelli Heemstra and Randall, 1986 (off Brighton Beach south of Durban Harbour)
Silver streak goldie Anthias cooperi Regan, 1902 (Natal coast and across Indian ocean to Japan and east coast of Australia)
Checked swallowtail Holanthias borbonius (Valenciennes, 1828) (1 specimen off Durban, Mauritius, Reunion, Comores, Madagascar and Japan)
Gorgeous swallowtail Holanthias natalensis (Fowler, 1925) (East London to Madagascar and Reunion) 
Threadfin goldie Nemanthias carberryi Smith, 1954 (Western Indian ocean south to Natal)
Silverspots Plectranthias longimanus (Weber, 1913) (Natal to Kenya)
Flagfin Plectranthias morgansi (Smith, 1961) (Five specimens off Kenya and 3 off South Africa)
Redblotch basslet Plectranthias winniensis (Tyler, 1966) Western Indian ocean to Natal)
Sea goldie Pseudanthias squamipinnis (Peters, 1855) (Port Elizabeth to Mozambique) (syn. Anthias squamipinnis)

Subfamily: Epinephelinae

Goldribbon soapfish Aulacocephalus temminckii Bleeker, 1854 (Indo-Pacific south to Durban)
Peacock rockcod Cephalophalis argus Schneider, 1801 (Durban to Red sea)
Golden rockcod Cephalopholis aurantia (Valenciennes, 1828) (Mauritius, Reunion, Seychelles, east and southern Africa south to Durban)
Coral rockcod Cephalopholis miniata (Forsskål, 1775) (Central KwaZulu-Natal to Red Sea)
Duskyfin rockcod Cephalopholis nigripinnis (Valenciennes, 1828) (Indian Ocean south to Natal)
Tomato rockcod Cephalopholis sonnerati (Valenciennes, 1828) (Indian Ocean south to Durban)
Smooth rockcod Dermatolepis striolatus (Playfair 1867) (Durban to Oman)
White-edged rockcod Epinephelus albomarginatus Boulenger, 1903 (East London to southern Mozambique)
Catface rockcod Epinephelus andersoni Boulenger, 1903 (Mossel Bay to southern Mozambique)
Squaretail rockcod Epinephelus areolatus (Forsskål, 1775) (Natal to Red Sea)
Whitespotted rockcod Epinephelus coeruleopunctatus (Bloch, 1790) (Indian Ocean south to Natal)
Moustache rockcod Epinephelus chabaudi Castelnau, 1861 (Algoa Bay to Kenya)
Brownspotted rockcod Epinephelus chlorostigma (Valenciennes. 1828) (Natal to Red Sea)
Redbarred rockcod Epinephelus fasciatus (Forsskål, 1775) (Port Alfred to Red Sea)
Bigspot rockcod Epinephelus faveatus (Valenciennes, 1828) (Indian Ocean to Natal)
Yellowtail rockcod Epinephelus flavocaeruleus (Lacepède, 1802) (Port Alfred to Kenya)
Brindlebass Epinephelus lanceolatus (Bloch, 1790) (Tropical Indo-Pacific south to Algoa Bay)
Streakyspot rockcod Epinephelus longispinis (Kner, 1865) (Indian ocean, Transkei to Indonesia)
Yellowbelly rockcod Epinephelus marginatus (Lowe, 1834) (Namibia to Mozambique) Formerly identified as Epinephelus guaza (Linnaeus, 1758)
Speckled rockcod Epinephelus magniscuttis Postel, Fourmanoir & Guézé, 1963 (Sodwana Bay, Mozambique, Mauritius and Reunion)
Malabar rockcod Epinephelus malabaricus (Schneider, 1801) (Transkei to Red Sea)
One-blotch rockcod Epinephelus melanostigma (Schultz, 1953) (Indian Ocean south to Durban)
Honeycomb rockcod Epinephelus merra Bloch, 1793 (Indo-West Pacific to Transkei)
Contour rockcod Epinephelus morrhua (Valenciennes, 1833) (Durban to Red Sea)
Dot-dash rockcod Epinephalus poecilonotus (Temminck & Schlegel, 1842) (Port Alfred to Somalia)
Tiger rockcod Epinephelus posteli Fourmanoir & Crosnier, 1964 (Natal, Mozambique and Madagascar)
Oblique banded rockcod Epinephelus radiatus (Day, 1867) (Natal, Mauritius, Reunion, south India, Chagos archipelago, east to southern Japan)
Halfmoon rockcod Epinephelus rivulatus (Valenciennes, 1830) (Algoa Bay to India)
Foursaddle rockcod Epinephelus spilotoceps Schultz, 1953 (Natal to Kenya)
Orangespotted rockcod Epinephelus suillus (Valenciennes, 1828) (Natal to Persian Gulf)
Greasy rockcod Epinephelus tauvina (Forsskål, 1775) (Red Sea to Natal)
Potato bass Epinephelus tukula Morgans, 1959 (Indo-West Pacific from Central KwaZulu-Natal to Japan and Australia)
Lyretail or Swallowtail rockcod Variola louti (Forsskål, 1775) (Central KwaZulu-Natal to Mozambique)

Subfamily: Grammistinae — Soapfishes and Podges

Blotched podge Aporops bilinearis Schultz, 1943 (Sodwana Bay to Kenya) (syn. Aporops allfreei Smith, 1953)
Arrowhead soapfish Belonoperca chabanaudi Fowler & Bean, 1930 (Central Pacific to east Africa, south to Natal)
Sixstripe soapfish Grammistes sexlineatus (Thunberg, 1792) (East London to Red Sea)
Honeycomb podge Pseudogramma polyacantha (Bleeker, 1856) (Indo-Pacific south to Sodwana Bay)

Subfamily: Liopropomatinae

Subfamily: Serraninae

Koester Acanthistius sebastoides (Castelnau, 1861) (Namibia to Mozambique)
Comber Serranus knysnaensis (Gilchrist 1904) formerly identified as Serranus cabrilla (Linnaeus, 1758) (Endemic, False Bay to Durban)

Family: Sillaginidae — Sillagos
Clubfoot sillago Sillago chondropus Bleeker, 1849 (Indo-West Pacific south to Durban)
Blotchy sillago Sillago maculatus Quoy and Gaimard, 1824 (China to South Africa)
Silver smelt or Silver sillago Sillago sihama (Forsskål, 1775) (Indo-West Pacific south to Knysna)

Family: Sparidae — Seabreams
River bream Acanthopagrus berda (Forsskål, 1775) (Tropical Indo-Pacific south to Knysna)
Two-bar seabream Acanthopagrus bifasciatus (Forsskål, 1775) (Red Sea to Natal)
Soldier bream Argyrops filamentosus (Valenciennes, 1830) (Red Sea to Natal)
King soldierbream Argyrops spinifer (Forsskål, 1775) (Tropical Indo-West Pacific south to Knysna))
Carpenter Argyrozona argyrozona (Valenciennes, 1830) (Cape Columbine to central KwaZulu-Natal)
Fransmadam Boopsoidea inornata Castelnau, 1861 (Cape Columbine to central KwaZulu-Natal)
Santer Cheimerius nufar (Valenciennes, 1830) (Mossel Bay to Mozambique)
Englishman Chrysoblephus anglicus (Gilchrist & Thompson, 1908) (Port Elizabeth to Mozambique)
Dageraad Chrysoblephus cristiceps (Valenciennes, 1830) (Cape Point to Durban)
Red stumpnose or Miss Lucy Chrysoblephus gibbiceps (Valenciennes, 1830) (Cape Point to East London)
Roman Chrysoblephus laticeps (Valenciennes, 1830) (Cape Point to southern KwaZulu-Natal)(Cape to Mauritius)
False Englishman Chrysoblephus lophus (Fowler, 1925) (Transkei to Northern KwaZulu-Natal)(Natal)
Slinger Chrysoblephus puniceus (Gilchrist & Thompson, 1908) (Knysna to Mozambique)
White karanteen Crenidens crenidens (Forsskål, 1775) (Red Sea to East London)
Poenskop or Black musselcrackerCymatoceps nasutus (Castelnau, 1861) (Cape Columbine to Durban)
Blacktail Diplodus capensis (Smith, 1844) (Angola to Madagascar) (syn. Diplodus sargus capensis)
Zebra Diplodus cervinus hottentotus (Smith, 1844) (Cape Point to Sodwana Bay)
Janbruin Gymnocrotaphus curvidens Günther, 1859 (Cape Point to Durban)
West coast steenbras Lithognathus aureti Smith, 1962 (West coast; Cape Town to Angola)
White steenbras Lithognathus lithognathus (Cuvier, 1829) (Orange River to Durban)
Sand steenbras Lithognathus mormyrus (Linnaeus, 1758)(Mediterranean to the Cape of Good Hope and round to Mozambique)
Blue hottentot Pachymetopon aeneum (Gilchrist & Thompson, 1908) (Cape Point to Sodwana Bay)
Hottentot Pachymetopon blochii (Valenciennes, 1830) (Angola to Cape Agulhas)
Bronze bream Pachymetopon grande Günther, 1859 (Mossel Bay to Mozambique)(Cape to Madagascar)
Red tjor-tjor or Sand soldier Pagellus natalensis Steindachner, 1903 (Mossel Bay to Madagascar)(syn. Pagellus bellottii natalensis)
Red steenbras Petrus rupestris (Valenciennes, 1830) (Cape Point to Durban)
German Polyamblyodon germanum (Barnard, 1934) (East London to Maputo)
Christie Polyamblodon gibbosum (Pellegrin) (Natal to Beira)
Blueskin Polysteganus caeruleopunctatus Klunzinger, 1870 (Red Sea to Natal south coast)
Scotsman Polysteganus praeorbitalis (Günther, 1859) (Port Elizabeth to Beira)
Seventy-four Polysteganus undulosus (Regan, 1908) (Port Elizabeth to Maputo)(Cape of Good Hope to Delagoa Bay)
Dane Porcostoma dentata (Gilchrist & Thompson, 1908) (Central KwaZulu-Natal to Mozambique)(Knysna to Beira)
Panga Pterogymnus laniarius (Valenciennes, 1830) (Cape Point to Transkei)(Cape to Beira)
White stumpnose Rhabdosargus globiceps (Valenciennes, 1830) (Namibia to East London)(Angola to Natal)
Cape stumpnose Rhabdosargus holubi (Steindachner, 1881) (Cape Agulhas to Maputo)(Cape to Natal)
Natal stumpnose Rhabdosargus sarba (Forsskål, 1775) (Port Elizabeth to Mozambique)(Red sea to Knysna)
Bigeye stumpnose Rhabdosargus thorpei Smith, 1979 (Durban to southern Mozambique)
Strepie Sarpa salpa (Linnaeus, 1758) (Cape Columbine to Maputo)(Mediterranean and eastern Atlantic round South Africa to southern Mozambique)
Musselcracker Sparodon durbanensis (Castelnau, 1861) (Cape Columbine to Durban)
Steentjie Spondyliosoma emarginatum (Valenciennes, 1830) (Saldanha Bay to Durban) Spondyliosoma emarginatum

Family: Terapontidae — Thornfishes

Trumpeter Pelates quadrilineatus (Bloch, 1790) (tropical Indo-Pacific south to Transkei)
Thornfish Terapon jarbua (Forsskål, 1775) (Indo-West Pacific to Knysna)
Straight lined thornfish Terapon Theraps (Cuvier, 1829) (Tropical Indo-Pacific south to Durban)

References

South Africa
Marine biodiversity of South Africa
South African animal biodiversity lists